Kaigake-ike Dam is an earthfill dam located in Shiga prefecture in Japan. The dam is used for irrigation. The catchment area of the dam is 0.8 km2. The dam impounds about 3  ha of land when full and can store 260 thousand cubic meters of water. The construction of the dam was completed in 1954.

References

Dams in Shiga Prefecture
1954 establishments in Japan